The 2017 Touring Car Masters was an Australian motor racing series for touring cars manufactured between 1 January 1963 and 31 December 1978. It was the eleventh running of the Touring Car Masters series. Each car was allocated into one the following classes: Pro Masters, Pro Am, Pro Sports, IROC (Porsche), Trans Am.

The series was won by Steven Johnson driving a Ford Mustang. Johnson also won the Pro Masters class with Adam Bressington (Chevrolet Camaro) winning Pro Am and Darren Beale (Holden Monaro GTS) winning Pro Sports.

Teams and drivers 
The following teams and drivers contested the 2017 series.

Race calendar  
The series was contested over seven rounds. Rounds included Series Races and non-points Dometic Trophy Races (indicated below with TR).

 † New lap records
 Jason Gomersall had a large accident at turn six on lap one during Race 2 at Sandown Raceway. Therefore the race was abandoned.

Series standings

Outright standings

Class standings

References

Touring Car Masters
Touring Car Masters